Walk Safely to School Day is an annual, national event in Australia in which primary school children are encouraged to walk or commute safely to school, an initiative of the Pedestrian Council of Australia.  It is held annually in May on a varying date.

Originally only held in New South Wales from 1999 to 2003, the event began nationally on 2 April 2004.

The event is sponsored by the Department of Health and Ageing, and is supported by all state, territory and local governments, the Heart Foundation, the Cancer Council, Planet Ark, Diabetes Australia, Beyond Blue, and the Australian Conservation Foundation.

The 2017 date was 19 May.

See also
Crossing guard
Pedestrian crossing
Walkability
Walk to school campaign
Walk to Work Day
Walking bus

References

Education in Australia
May observances
Pedestrian activism